This is a list of laundry topics. Laundry is the washing of clothing and linens (e.g. sheets and towels). Laundry processes are often done in a business, room or area in a home or apartment building, reserved for that purpose; this is referred to as a laundry room. The material that is being washed, or has been laundered, is also generally referred to as laundry.

Laundry topics

Chemicals

 Biological detergent – laundry detergent that contains enzymes harvested from micro-organisms such as bacteria adapted to live in hot springs. The description is commonly used in the United Kingdom,
 Bleach
 Fabric softener
 Laundry detergent

Washing

 Combo washer dryer
 Dry cleaning
Posser or washing dolly, a tool for agitating the wet fabric
 Washboard and washing paddle, also known under many other names
 Wash copper, a portable or built-in boiler
 Washing machine
 Wet cleaning, a retronym meaning "not dry cleaning"

Drying

 Airing cupboard
 Clothes dryer
 Clothes horse or drying rack or many other names
 Clothes line
 Drying cabinet
 Hills Hoist
Kitchen maid (pulley airer)
 Mangle (machine)
Sheila Maid
 Winter Dyke

Finishing
 Box mangle
 Fluff and Fold, a service provided by commercial laundrettes
 Ironing
 Tunnel finisher

Industrial
 Industrial laundry
 Tunnel washer

Concepts

Some of these relate more to textile manufacturing than laundry, but there is overlap in how wet cloth is processed.

 Color fastness, the degree to which a textile retains its color without fading or bleeding
 Fulling – a step in making woollen cloth - cleaning the fleece to eliminate oils, dirt, and other impurities, and making it thicker.
 Posting, trampling or treading wet clothing
 Shrinkage
 Stain

Organizations
 Dry Cleaning and Laundry International
 Dry Cleaning Institute of Australia
 Chinese Hand Laundry Alliance
 Laundry and Dry Cleaning International Union
 Laundry Workers Industrial Union
 Magdalene asylum
 Project Laundry List – a New Hampshire group that encourages the outdoor drying of clothes
 Worshipful Company of Launderers – a livery company in the City of London that promotes the profession of the launderers by awarding scholarships to laundry students.

Companies
 5àsec - a French franchise network
 Washio (company) - defunct laundry delivery service
 SudShare - an American app-based laundry cleaning and delivery company

Culture
 Dadeumi, the traditional Korean practice of rhythmically beating cloth, associated with the hardships of a woman's life
 Dhobiwallah, or dhobi, the washermen in South Central Asia (India, Pakistan, Sri Lanka, etc.), and their caste group, historically associated with washing clothes
 Fullo, the Latin word for a person washing laundry
 Washerwoman or laundress
 Housekeeping
 Laundry symbols

Accessories

 Clothes hanger
 Clothes iron
 Clothespin
 Dispensing ball
 Dryer ball
 Hamper
 Laundry ball

Law
 Barbier v. Connolly
 Kimball Laundry Co. v. United States
 Muller v. Oregon
 Pearson v. Chung
 Yick Wo v. Hopkins

Places
 Baths and wash houses in Britain, public places that included facilities for washing the body as well as clothes
 Dhobi ghat, any open-air washing-place in southern central Asia 
 Mahalaxmi Dhobi Ghat, a well-known open air laundry in Mumbai, India.
 Laundry room, in a private dwelling
 Lavoir, a public open-air wash-house in a village
 Self-service laundry, also known as a coin wash, laundromat, washeteria, laundrette
 Tvättstuga, a shared laundry room in a hall of residence or block of flats
 Utility room, in a private dwelling that includes laundry functions

References

 
Technology-related lists